Adam Smith (born April 9, 1990) is a former American football offensive guard who played for four seasons with the Philadelphia Soul of the Arena Football League (AFL). He played college football at Western Kentucky.

College career
Adam Smith played college football at Western Kentucky. He was in for 764 plays in 2012 at Western Kentucky. He accumulated 55 knock down blocks and 41 pancake blocks.

Tampa Bay Buccaneers
On April 29, 2013, Adam Smith was signed as an undrafted free agent by the Tampa Bay Buccaneers. On August 27, 2013, he was waived by the Buccaneers.

Philadelphia Soul
On December 11, 2015 Smith was assigned to the Philadelphia Soul for the 2016 season. On April 19, 2017, Smith was assigned to the Soul.

References

External links
Tampa Bay Buccaneers bio
Western Kentucky Hilltoppers bio

American football offensive guards
Tampa Bay Buccaneers players
1990 births
Living people
People from Murfreesboro, Tennessee
Western Kentucky Hilltoppers football players
Players of American football from Tennessee
Philadelphia Soul players